The Ralik Chain (Marshallese:) is a chain of islands within the island nation of the Marshall Islands.  Ralik means "sunset".  It is west of the Ratak Chain. In 1999 the total population of the Ralik islands was 19,915. Christopher Loeak, who became President of the Marshall Islands in 2012, was formerly Minister for the Ralik Chain.

List of atolls and isolated islands in the chain:

 Ailinginae Atoll
 Ailinglaplap Atoll
 Bikini Atoll
 Ebon Atoll
 Enewetak Atoll
 Jabat Island
 Jaluit Atoll
 Kili Island
 Kwajalein Atoll
 Lae Atoll
 Lib Island
 Namdrik Atoll
 Namu Atoll
 Rongdrik Atoll
 Rongelap Atoll
 Ujae Atoll
 Ujelang Atoll
 Wotho Atoll

Language

The Rālik Chain is home to the Rālik dialect (or western dialect) of the Marshallese language.  It is mutually intelligible with the Ratak dialect (or eastern dialect) located on the Ratak Chain.  The two dialects differ mainly in lexicon and in certain regular phonological reflexes.

References

 
 Ralik Chain
Archipelagoes of the Pacific Ocean